Tomáš Cakl and Marek Semjan chose to not defend their 2008 title.
Yang Tsung-hua and Yi Chu-huan defeated Alexey Kedryuk and Junn Mitsuhashi 6–7(9), 6–3, [12–10] in the final.

Seeds

Draw

Finals

References
 Doubles draw

Doubles